is a Japanese voice actor. He was previously affiliated by With Line, but is now currently represented by First Wind Production.

Filmography

Television animation
Ace of Diamond (2014), Itsuki Tadano
Aldnoah.Zero (2014), Okisuke Mikuni
Magical Warfare (2014), Tsuganashi Aiba (young)
One Week Friends (2014), Yūki Hase
Re:_Hamatora (2014), Hikaru 
Ace of Diamond Second Season (2015), Itsuki Tadano
Aldnoah.Zero (2015), Okisuke Mikuni
Assassination Classroom (2015), Tomohito Sugino
Miritari! (2015), Sōhei Yano
Re-Kan! (2015), Kenta Yamada
Noragami Aragoto (2015), Tatsumi
Assassination Classroom 2nd Season (2016), Tomohito Sugino
Tsukipro The Animation (2017), Kensuke Yaegashi
Amai Chōbatsu: Watashi wa Kanshu Senyō Pet (2018), Myojin Aki
Black Clover (2018-2021), Marx Francois
The Rising of the Shield Hero (2019-present), Itsuki Kawasumi
Ace of Diamond Act II (2019), Itsuki Tadano
Afterlost (2019), Shunpei
Kono Oto Tomare! Sounds of Life (2019), Kiyoshi Kasugai
Welcome to Demon School! Iruma-kun (2019), Shax Reid
Stars Align (2019), Yūta Asuka
If My Favorite Pop Idol Made It to the Budokan, I Would Die (2020), Motoi
A3! Season Spring & Summer (2020), Muku Sakisaka
Jujutsu Kaisen (2020), Junpei Yoshino
Talentless Nana (2020), Moguo's henchman C
Irina: The Vampire Cosmonaut (2021), Franz Felman
Flaglia (2023), Rabu

Films
Digimon Adventure: Last Evolution Kizuna (2020), Iori Hida
Digimon Adventure 02: The Beginning (TBA), Iori Hida

Games
Assassination Classroom: Koro-sensei Dai Hōimō (2015), Tomohito Sugino
Tōken Ranbu (2015), Tōshirō Akita
Yume Oukoku to Nemureru Hyakunin no Oujisama (2015), Prince Azalee
MapleStory (2015), Jay
A3! (2017), Muku Sakisaka
Ikemen Sengoku (2017), Ishida Mitsunari
 The Idolm@ster SideM (2017) Kyosuke Aoi

Live-action
One Week Friends (2017)

Dubbing
Hank Zipzer (Nick McKelty (Jude Foley))

References

External links
 
 Yoshitaka Yamaya Profile at First Wind Production

Japanese male voice actors
Living people
Male voice actors from Sendai
1992 births